Maria Milagros "Mitos" Habana-Magsaysay (born January 4, 1964), is a Filipino politician who served as Congresswoman of the 1st district of Zambales from 2004 to 2013, and was a senatorial candidate of the United Nationalist Alliance in the 2013 election.

Political career
She was a representative from the 1st District of Zambales for 3 consecutive terms.

Mitos Magsaysay claimed in February 2013 that the Liberal Party was using arm-twisting tactics on some politicians and local executives who are friendly to United Nationalist Alliance (UNA).

On November 27, 2018, Magsaysay officially filed her certificate of candidacy for Congresswoman of the 1st district of Zambales and Olongapo City. To reclaim her seat in the House of Representatives, she was up against incumbent 1st District Congressman Jeffrey Khonghun who was gunning for his 3rd and last term as representative of the first district of Zambales. She was a Partido Federal ng Pilipinas (PFP) candidate and, after the 2019 elections, lost to Khonghun by more than 68,000 votes.

Personal life
She is married to Jesus Vicente Magasaysay, son of former Zambales Governor Vicente Magsaysay.

References

1964 births
Members of the House of Representatives of the Philippines from Zambales
Lakas–CMD politicians
Lakas–CMD (1991) politicians
People from Zambales
Living people
PDP–Laban politicians
United Nationalist Alliance politicians
Mitos
Partido Federal ng Pilipinas politicians